Mahi may also refer to:

 Mahi (village), a village in Allahabad, India
 Mahi, Iran, a village in Lorestan Province, Iran
 Mahi River, a river of western India
 Mahi-mahi, a kind of fish
 Mahi, an album by Bollywood star Aneela
 Mahi people, of Benin
 Mahi (name), list of people with this name
 Mahendra Singh Dhoni, an Indian cricketer nicknamed Mahi